Anuja Chauhan is an Indian author, advertiser and screenwriter. As a writer, she is known for The Zoya Factor (2008),  Battle For Bittora (2010), Those Pricey Thakur Girls (2013),  The House That BJ Built (2015), Baaz (2017), and Club You To Death (2021). She worked at the JWT advertising agency in India for over 17 years, becoming vice-president and executive creative director before resigning in 2010 to pursue a full-time literary career.

Early life and education
Born in the north Indian state of Uttar Pradesh, Chauhan spent most of her childhood in various cantonment towns in North India, as her father served in the Indian Army. He took premature retirement at the rank of Lieutenant Colonel, migrating to Australia thereafter. She is the youngest of four sisters: Padmini, Rohini, Nandini, and Anuja. Her older sister Nandini Bajpai is also an author.

She did her schooling at the Army Public School, New Delhi, Sophia Girls Convent, Meerut Cantonment and Delhi Public School, Mathura Road, New Delhi. She has a bachelor's degree in economics from Miranda House, Delhi University, and a post graduate diploma in mass communication from the Royal Melbourne Institute of Technology.

Career

Advertising
Chauhan joined JWT in 1993 and in the next seventeen years was responsible for many memorable catchphrases, primarily for Pepsi Cola, India, such as "Yeh Dil Maange More!", "Mera Number Kab Aayega","Nothing official about it" and " Oye Bubbly". Over the years she worked with brands like Pepsi, Kurkure, Mountain Dew and Nokia, creating Pepsi's "Nothing official about it" campaign and advertising slogans such as Pepsi's "Yeh Dil Maange More" and "Oye Bubbly". Other popular catchphrases she worked on include Darr ke Aage Jeet Hai for Mountain Dew, Tedha Hai par Mera Hai for Kurkure, "Be a Little Dillogical", for Lays Chips and KitKat Break Banta Hai for Nestle Kit Kat. By 2003 and at age 33, she was one of the youngest vice-presidents in JWT. She features regularly in The Economic Times supplement Brand Equity's list of the ten hottest creative directors in India, and was ranked 26th in the 'creativerankings 2010', a list of the leading executive creative directors in Asia-Pac.

In August 2010, she resigned from her post of vice-president and Executive Creative Director at JWT to pursue a career in writing. She has remained active as an advertising consultant and was the only Indian to feature on the One Show Jury for the year 2011. In 2014, she started working on the Pepsi brand again, as a consultant for the Power of One team at JWT. She also consults for a few other favoured clients.

Author
She started working on her first novel in 2006. Cricket became the setting of her novel The Zoya Factor, after her work on the Pepsi brand for 13 years and close association with cricket advertising. The Zoya Factor ran the danger of being dismissed as 'Mills and Boon-ish' but most reviewers were quick to praise the depth of the author's characters, her wicked descriptions and the authenticity of her Hinglish laced dialogue.

She has been hailed as the best chick lit writer in India, but has repeatedly stated that "Chicks are small, brainless, powerless creatures, bred to be eaten. I'm not a chick and I don't write for chicks." The Zoya Factor has won Cosmopolitan Magazine, India's Fun Fearless Female award for literature (2008) and the India Today Woman award for Woman as Storyteller (2009). It was longlisted for the India Plaza Golden Quill (2009). The novel was optioned for a film by Shah Rukh Khans Red Chillies Entertainment production company. The option was for three years. Subsequently, the rights were purchased by Pooja Shetty Deora's Walkwater Films. The film, also titled The Zoya Factor, directed by Abhishek Sharma, produced by Fox Star Studios, Adlabs and Walkwater films, with dialogues by Chauhan, and starring Sonam Kapoor and Dulquer Salmaan was scheduled for release in September 2019.

Her book, Battle For Bittora was released in 2010 by actor Saif Ali Khan in Delhi in October 2010, to critical approval from India Today, Outlook, The Week and Tehelka magazines.

Tehelka called it a "worthy successor to The Zoya Factor." According to Ira Pande, in Outlook magazine, Chauhan 'manages to legitimise a new vocabulary emerging from the violent collision between Bharat and India that has all the promise of a new lingua franca. In the way that Piyush Pandey, Prasoon Joshi and A. R. Rahman have brought a whiff of newness into lyrics and jingles, this new language may outrage purists but describes perfectly memorable Indian sense-impressions, such as Bhainscafe, the brew that marries instant coffee with nauseatingly rich buffalo milk.' The Hindustan Times is its review commended the book for its treatment, while giving the "biggest vote" to novel's characterisation.

The film rights for Battle of Bittora were purchased by the film production company Saregama for three years for an undisclosed sum, and then sold to Anil Kapoor Film Company. A film starring Fawad Khan and Sonam Kapoor, produced by Rhea Kapoor has been announced. Shooting will commence in November 2015.

Her third book, "Those Pricey Thakur Girls", set in pre-liberalization India, was released in January 2013 and is the first in a series of novels about the Thakurs of Hailey Road, an upper-middle-class Rajput family of five alphabetically named sisters. Initial sales and reviews were positive, with the book debuting and staying steady at Number 2 on The Asian Age's Top Ten Fiction Bestsellers list and comparisons to Jane Austen cropping up in every review.  Mint scribed her writing style "as a mix of wit and colloquial exuberance and calling her the only Indian writer of popular fiction really worth buying." Tehelka called her, "quite simply, the funniest writer of contemporary popular fiction." While India Today stated that 'beneath the bubble and froth of this delightful novel, lies the starker reality of Delhi life.'

The book was converted it into a daily soap twice. The first rendition was titled Dilli Wali Thakur Girls, and ran on &TV, starring Sukirti Kandpal and Aamir Ali and produced by Cinevistaas.
The second adaptation, titled Dil Bekaraar was released on Disney Hotstar on the 26th of November 2021 a Hindi romantic-comedy-drama web series. It stars Akshay Oberoi, Sahher Bambba, Anjali Anand, Raj Babbar, Padmini Kolhapure, Poonam Dhillon and Sukhmani Sadana, and is directed by Habib Faisal, while Tarun Mansukhani has a Creative producer credit. This series was generally agreed to be a more true adaptation of the source material and met with both critical and popular praise.

Chauhan has also written the screenplay of a commercial feature film – a love story titled Guppie – mein liar nahi shayar hoon by Nikhil Advani a Bollywood producer/director who directed Kal Ho Na Ho and Patiala House, starring Akshay Kumar. She is currently writing two more screenplays, one for Anil Kapoor Film Company and one for production studio UTV-Disney.

In early 2015, she moved from her long-time publishers HarperCollins India, to Westland, to 'try something new and reach out to more people.' The parting from Harper was 'cordial' and they continued to publish her backlist.

The trailer for "The House that BJ Built" was launched on 15 May 2015. India Today said 'Chauhan is at the top of her game as she explores love and real estate in Delhi
"It's a funny, feisty novel, with her trademark, exuberant, golgappa dialogue-Hindi deliciously spooned and scooped into English to tart it up-in place and some moments that you at once recognise as pure Bollywood."

LiveMint's review of the book said "The House That BJ Built gives its readers, and its characters, exactly what they paid for."

She returned to HarperCollins India for her fifth novel 'Baaz' (1 May 2017) a passionate tale of love and war set in 1971, at a fictitious Indian Air Force Base loosely modelled on Kalaikunda, in West Bengal. Loved for her lead male characters, all of whom have a huge fan following, Anuja has stated that this latest hero Shaanu, aka Baaz, aka Flying Officer Ishaan Faujdaar, a jat boy from rural Haryana, is her favorite so far. India Today declared that "wartime love to Bollywood masala, this new novel has it all." Kaveree Bamzai called it a "cracker of a thriller" and "finally, a book worthy of the war during which it is set." While The Hindu stated that "you can smell both gun powder and romance in the air," and praised "the subtle commentary on the socio-political complexity of the times (which) keeps the reader close to ground reality."  
Online reviewers celebrated the fact that, despite the war-setting, the book is vintage Chauhan and as "laugh-out-loud funny and toe-curling sexy" as anything she has written previously.

The rights for Baaz have been purchased by Yash Raj Films.

She released her sixth novel Club You To Death in February 2021. It is her first murder mystery. In July 2021, Dinesh Vijan acquired the rights to make a film version.

Bibliography
 The Zoya Factor. 2008. HarperCollins. .
 Battle For Bittora: The Story Of India's Most Passionate Lok Sabha Contest!. 2010, HarperCollins. 
 Those Pricey Thakur Girls (January 2013) Harper-Collins.
 The House That BJ Built (May 2015) Westland. 
 Baaz (April 2017) HarperCollins
 Club You To Death (February 2021) HarperCollins

Honors and awards
Chauhan was featured in Femina magazine's list of the 50 most beautiful women in India in 2011 and in MSN's The Influentials, a list of the top 50 most powerful women in the country. In 2017, she won the Femina Women Achievers Award, in the Literary contribution category. In 2018, she was awarded for her contributuion to Literature, by the FICCI Ladies Organization.

Personal life
Chauhan is married to the television presenter and producer, Niret Alva. The two met in Delhi in 1989, during the production of a college play. They married in 1994. They have three children, two girls, Niharika and Nayantara and a boy, Daivik. Chauhan's mother-in-law is Margaret Alva, a senior leader of the Indian National Congress, the former General Secretary of the All India Congress Committee and the former Governor of the desert state of Rajasthan. The couple moved to Gurgaon, a Delhi-suburb in 2002. She converted to Christianity eleven years after her marriage, but in 2018, stated that it (Christianity) was as good or as bad as any other organised religion— and that she is now quite firmly post-religious. 'I have not lost all hope in a Maker, but I know that nobody has a patent on him. And that he does not dwell in brick or mortar or in purported birthplaces.

See also
 List of Indian writers

References

External links

 Battle for Bittora, Interview, 2010 at Mint
 Style in Battle for Bittora
 Dnaindia.com
 Zapondo.com
 Exchange4media.com
 Indiatimes.com 
 News.in.msn.com
 Riotous political romp
 Wartime love to Bollywood masala, this new novel has it all
 Why Anuja Chauhan deserves my salaam for her new book Baaz
 Anuja Chauhan’s new romance will raise heartbeats for more than one reason (there’s a war thrown in)
 ‘I love writing about the coolest thing’
 Blush.me
 Sonam Kapoor and Dulquer Salmaan to star in 'The Zoya Factor' – Movies to look forward to
 Sonam Kapoor will meet Anuja Chauhan to discuss The Zoya Factor

1970 births
Living people
Indian women novelists
Novelists from Uttar Pradesh
People from Meerut
Chick lit writers
English-language writers from India
Indian advertising people
Delhi University alumni
RMIT University alumni
Delhi Public School alumni
Women writers from Uttar Pradesh
21st-century Indian novelists
21st-century Indian women writers
21st-century Indian writers